Venigalla Rambabu is an Indian poet, lyricist, radio-personality, Avadhani (literary performer), and columnist known for his works in Telugu cinema, Telugu theatre, Telugu literature, Radio and Television.

Career
Rambabu holds MA-MPhil-PhD in Telugu literature from Osmania University. In 2007, he received Nandi Award for Best Lyricist for his work in the film Mee Sreyobhilashi.

Selected filmography 
 Ninne Premistha - 2000
 Simharasi - 2001
 Mee Sreyobhilashi - 2007
 Manorama - 2009
 Devaraya  - 2012
 Ee Manase - 2014
 Red Alert - 2015
 Raja Cheyyi Vesthe - 2016
 O Malli - 2016

Awards
Nandi Awards
 Best Lyricist - Mee Sreyobhilashi - 2007 
Other Awards
 Bharathamuni Award

References

Living people
Year of birth missing (living people)
Telugu people
Telugu poets
People from Telangana
Telugu-language lyricists
Osmania University alumni
Indian radio personalities
Indian radio actors
All India Radio people
Poets from Andhra Pradesh
21st-century Indian composers
Indian male songwriters
Male actors from Andhra Pradesh
Nandi Award winners
Male actors in Telugu cinema